SMS V43 was a  Large Torpedo Boat (Großes Torpedoboot) of the Imperial German Navy, that served during the First World War. V43 was built by AG Vulcan at their Stettin shipyard from 1914–1915, entering service on 28 May that year. V43 took part in operations in the North Sea, the English Channel and the Baltic Sea. She survived the war, and was interned at Scapa Flow, surviving the Scuttling of the German fleet at Scapa Flow. V43 was allocated to the US Navy, and was sunk as a target on 15 July 1921.

Construction

V43 was the first ship in the second batch of six V25-class torpedo boats (V43–V48) ordered from AG Vulcan for the Imperial German Navy on 22 April 1914, as part of the 1914 shipbuilding programme. She was launched as Yard number 358 on 27 January 1915 and completed on 20 July 1915.
 

Armament originally consisted of three 8.8 cm SK L/45 naval guns in single mounts, together with six 50 cm (19.7 in) torpedo tubes with two fixed single tubes forward and 2 twin mounts aft. Up to 24 mines could be carried. The ship had a complement of 87 officers and men.

Service
At the end of January 1916, V43 was part of the 6th Torpedo-boat Flotilla. On 10 February 1916, V43 took part in a sortie by 25 torpedo boats of the 2nd, 6th and 9th Torpedo-boat Flotillas into the North Sea. The sortie led to an encounter between several German torpedo boats and British minesweepers off the Dogger Bank, which resulted in the British minesweeper  being torpedoed and sunk by ships of the 2nd Flotilla. On 25 March 1916, the British seaplane carrier , escorted by the light cruisers and destroyers of the Harwich Force, launched an air raid against an airship base believed to be at Hoyer on the coast of Schleswig. The raid was unsuccessful, with the destroyer  being badly damaged in a collision (and later having to be scuttled) and German forces, including the 6th Torpedo-boat Flotilla with V43, sortied in response. Poor weather forced the German torpedo boats to turn back, but the torpedo boats  and  encountered British cruisers, with G194 being rammed by the British cruiser  and sunk, before the cruiser  collided with Cleopatra.

On 24 April 1916, the German battlecruisers of I Scouting Group and the light cruisers of the II Scouting Group set out from Kiel on a mission to bombard the British East-coast towns of Yarmouth and Lowestoft, with the torpedo boats of the 6th and 9th Torpedo Boat Flotillas as escorts, and V43 as part of the 6th Flotilla. The battleships of the High Seas Fleet were deployed in support, with the hope of destroying isolated elements of the British Forces if they tried to intercept. There was a brief engagement between the German forces and the light cruisers and destroyers of the Harwich Force, which caused the German battlecruisers to break off the bombardment of Lowestoft, but rather than take the change to destroy the outnumbered British force, the Germans chose to retire. V43 did not sail with the rest of the 6th Torpedo-boat Flotilla when it left Kiel on 31 May 1916, and so missed the Battle of Jutland.  V44 was part of the 7th Torpedo Boat Flotilla during the inconclusive Action of 19 August 1916, when the German High Seas Fleet sailed to cover a sortie of the battlecruisers of the 1st Scouting Group.

On 22 January 1917, 11 torpedo boats of the 6th Torpedo Boat Flotilla, including V43, left Helgoland to reinforce the German torpedo forces in Flanders. The British Admiralty knew about this transfer due to codebreaking by Room 40, and ordered the Harwich Force of cruisers and destroyers to intercept the German torpedo boats. he British set six light cruisers, two flotilla leaders and sixteen destroyers to intercept the eleven German ships, deploying them in several groups to make sure that all possible routes were covered. During the night of 22–23 January, the 6th Flotilla encountered three British light cruisers (and ). The 6th Flotilla carried out unsuccessful sorties into the Channel on 25 January and against a convoy between Britain and the Netherlands on 29 January before the Flanders forces were further reinforced on 18 February.

The Flanders-based flotillas launched a major attack on the Dover Barrage and shipping in the Channel on the night of 17/18 March. Seven torpedo boats of the 6th Flotilla, including V43 were to attack the Dover Barrage north of the Sandettie Bank, with five torpedo boats of the 1st Zeebrugge Half-Flotilla attacking south of the Sandettie Bank, and four ships of the 2nd Zeebrugge Half-Flotilla operating against the Downs. The 6th Flotilla met the British destroyer  on crossing the Dover Barrage. Paragon challenged the German torpedo boats, which replied with gunfire and torpedoes, Paragon being struck by torpedoes from S49 and G46 and sunk. The 12th Half-Flotilla (including V43) became separated from the rest of the 6th Flotilla in this action, and therefore returned to base, while the remaining three ships of the flotilla continued on, torpedoing and badly damaging the destroyer  before returning to base, while a merchant ship was sunk by the 2nd Zeebrugge Half-Flotilla east of the Downs. The 6th Flotilla returned to Germany on 29 March 1917.

In October 1917, Germany launched Operation Albion, an invasion of islands in the West Estonian archipelago to secure the left flank of the German Army following the German capture of Riga. The Germans assembled a powerful naval force to support the operation, reinforced by forces detached from the High Seas Fleet, including the 6th Torpedo Boat Flotilla and V44. In the resulting Second Battle of Heligoland Bight, the Germans evaded the British until the appearance of the battleships of the German High Seas Fleet caused the British to break off the action. Only a single German trawler was sunk.

Fate
After the end of hostilities, V43 was interned at Scapa Flow in accordance with the terms of the Armistice of 11 November 1918. On 21 June 1919, the German fleet interned at Scapa scuttled itself, but British forces managed to beach several of the ships before they could sink, including V43. The Treaty of Versailles allocated a battleship, a cruiser and three torpedo boats to the United States as "Propaganda ships", which could be used for a short period of time for experimental purposes or as targets. V43 was one of these ships. V43 turned over to the United States and commissioned on 4 June 1920 for passage across the Atlantic, before being decommissioned at Norfolk, Virginia on 30 August 1920. She was sunk as a target off Cape Henry by the American battleship  on 15 July 1921.

Notes

References

Sources

 
 

 

Torpedo boats of the Imperial German Navy
1915 ships
Ships built in Stettin
World War I torpedo boats of Germany